Ryan Graves may refer to:

 Ryan Graves (businessman) (born 1983), American billionaire businessman
 Ryan Graves (ice hockey) (born 1995),  Canadian professional ice hockey defenceman